Panellus is a genus of more than 50 mushroom species of fungi in the family Mycenaceae as defined molecularly. Prior to molecular analyses the generic name had been used for any white-spored pleurotoid with amyloid spores. Unrelated but similar species are now classified in Sarcomyxa and Scytinotus. In older guides and other literature the type species had been placed in either Pleurotus or Panus and the poroid species had been classified in the synonymous genus Dictyopanus or in broadly defined genera like Polyporus (Polyporaceae) or the more closely allied Favolaschia (Mycenaceae). The closest molecular allies are Resinomycena and Cruentomycena.

Description
The fruit bodies of Panellus species are small- or medium-sized and in most cases pleurotoid, meaning they grow on wood, have gills (some species have pores instead of gills), and usually form semicircular or kidney-shaped caps that may be either directly attached to the wood, or connected by short stipes. The stipe is usually connected to the side of the cap, or off-center. The gills on the underside of the cap usually radiate outward from the attachment point, or may be strongly interveined to form a reticulum. The spores are hyaline (white in deposit), thin-walled, smooth and  amyloid. Panellus is one of several genera in the Mycenaceae that are bioluminescent.

Species

Panellus albifavolus
Panellus alutaceus
Panellus ambiguus
Panellus aureofactus
Panellus bambusarum
Panellus bambusifavolus
Panellus belangeri
Panellus brunneifavolus
Panellus brunneomaculatus
Panellus crawfordiae
Panellus cremeus
Panellus cystidiatus
Panellus dichotomus
Panellus diversipes
Panellus dumontii
Panellus exiguus
Panellus flabellatus
Panellus fulgens
Panellus fuscatus
Panellus globisporus 
Panellus glutinosus
Panellus haematopus
Panellus hispidifavolus
Panellus intermedius
Panellus jalapensis
Panellus longinquus
Panellus luminescens
Panellus luteolus
Panellus luteus
Panellus luxfilamentus
Panellus magnus
Panellus megalosporus
Panellus melleo-ochraceus
Panellus microsporus
Panellus minimus 
Panellus minusculus
Panellus mitis
Panellus niger
Panellus nubigenus
Panellus olivaceus
Panellus orientalis
Panellus parvulus
Panellus pauciporus
Panellus pendens
Panellus pteridophytorum
Panellus pubescens
Panellus pusillus
Panellus pyrulifer
Panellus reticulatovenosus
Panellus ringens
Panellus rupicola
Panellus serotinus
Panellus stenocystis
Panellus stipticus
Panellus subcantharelloides
Panellus sublamelliformis
Panellus sublevatus
Panellus violaceofulvus

References

External links

Mycenaceae
Agaricales genera